Angela Kate Petty (née Smit; born 16 August 1991) is a New Zealand middle-distance athlete.

Biography
Born in Christchurch in 1991, she was educated at Rangiora High School. In 2007, she won the New Zealand secondary schools 800 m title, clocking 2:11.42.

The following year Petty represented New Zealand in the 800 m at the World Junior Championships in Bydgoszcz, Poland, finishing fourth in her semi-final in a time of 2:08.73, and she successfully defended her national schools 800 m title. At the Athletics Canterbury Awards in 2010, she was co-winner with Tom Walsh of the junior athlete of the year award.

She competed in the 800 m at the 2010 World Junior Championships, where she was again eliminated in the semi-finals, finishing in 2:05.51.

At the 2012 New Zealand championships, she won the 800 m title and was second in both the 400 m and 1500 m. In July that year, she ran the 800 m in 2:00.67 at a meet in Heusden, Belgium, just failing to qualify for the New Zealand team for the 2012 Olympics.

Petty and Walsh were joint winners of Athletics Canterbury's athlete of the year award in 2013. In July 2013, she ran a personal best of 2:00.03 for 800 m in finishing fourth at the World University Games in Kazan, and backed it up two weeks later with 2:00.42 to finish fifth in the Diamond League meet in London. At the World Athletics Championships in Moscow the following month, she clocked 2:00.60 in finishing fourth in her 800 m heat and did not progress further.

Petty represented New Zealand in the 800 m at the 2014 Commonwealth Games in Glasgow, finishing fifth in the final in a time of 2.01:94.

Petty studied for a Bachelor of Arts degree in education at the University of Canterbury, Christchurch. In 2014, she married British triathlete Sam Petty.

Personal bests

References

1991 births
Living people
Athletes from Christchurch
University of Canterbury alumni
New Zealand female middle-distance runners
Commonwealth Games competitors for New Zealand
Athletes (track and field) at the 2014 Commonwealth Games
Athletes (track and field) at the 2018 Commonwealth Games
World Athletics Championships athletes for New Zealand
People educated at Rangiora High School
Olympic athletes of New Zealand
Athletes (track and field) at the 2016 Summer Olympics
Universiade medalists in athletics (track and field)
Universiade gold medalists for New Zealand
Medalists at the 2015 Summer Universiade